The Raga Music is a set of pieces composed by notable Indian composer John Mayer. The pieces were composed in 1957 and published in 1958.

They are composed for a solo clarinet (preferably in A) and comprise nine movements:
1. Vilasakhani
2. Megha (Rainy Season)
3. Vibhasa (Sunrise)
4. Gunakali (Morning)
5. Shri (Afternoon)
6. Pilu (Evening)
7. Puravi (End of Day)
8. Kanada (In the deep of Night)
9. Vasanta (Spring Raga)

1957 compositions
Solo clarinet pieces